Trav may refer to:
 Harness racing, a form of horse-racing in Scandinavia
 La traviata, an opera by Giuseppe Verdi
 Travian, a massively multiplayer online browser-based strategy game
 Trav (musician), an American rapper and songwriter